AM-23 may refer to:

Afanasev Makarov AM-23, a Soviet aircraft gun
USS Teal (AM-23), a U.S. Navy minesweeper